Matthew Croose Parry (11 December 1885 in Birley – 5 February 1931 in Carrigrohane, Ireland), was an Irish cricketer who played for Warwickshire. He was educated at Hereford Cathedral School.

References

External links 
  from Cricinfo.

1885 births
1931 deaths
Irish cricketers
Warwickshire cricketers